Croham was a ward in the London Borough of Croydon, London in the United Kingdom, covering part of the Croham Hurst and South Croydon.
The ward returned three councillors every four years to Croydon Council. At the 2002 election, Maria Gatland, Michael Neal and Jason Perry were elected, as Conservative Party candidates, positions which they subsequently retained in the 2006, 2010 and 2014 elections. At the 2011 Census the population of the ward was 15,790.

The ward was in Croydon South constituency held by Chris Philp MP, one of the safest Conservative seats in London.

Boundaries

1978-2002

Commencing at a point where the eastern boundary of Waddon Ward meets the southern boundary of Fairfield Ward, thence southeastwards along said southern boundary to the northwestern boundary of Heathfield Ward, thence southwestwards along said boundary and continuing southwestwards and southeastwards along the western boundary of the Croham Hurst Golf Course to Upper Selsdon Road, thence northwestwards along said road to Arkwright Road, thence southwestwards, southeastwards and southwestwards along said road to Briton Hill Road, thence westwards along said road to Sanderstead Road, thence southeastwards along said road to Purley Oaks Road, thence westwards along said road to the road known as Downsway, thence southwards along said road to a point opposite the northern boundary of No 2 Downsway thence northwestwards to and along said boundary and generally southwestwards along the rear boundaries of Nos 2-40 Downsway to the southern boundary of No 40 Downsway, thence southeastwards along said boundary to said road, thence southwestwards along said road to Purley Downs Road, thence northwestwards along said road to Grid Reference TQ 3278561842, thence southwestwards in a straight line to Grid Reference TQ 3270061700 being a point in prolongation southeastwards of the rear boundary of No 104 Purley Downs Road, thence northwestwards along said prolongation and the rear boundaries of Nos 104-98 Purley Downs Road to the Beckenham-Woodside railway, thence northeastwards along said railway to Purley Oaks Road, thence northwestwards along said road to the southeastern boundary of No 1 Station Approach, thence northeastwards along said boundary and northwestwards along the northeastern boundary of said property, and in continuation crossing the railway at Purley Oaks Station to Brantwood Road to the station, thence northeastwards along said road and northwestwards along Brantwood Road to Brighton Road, thence southwestwards along said road to Biddulph Road (northern arm), thence northwestwards along said road to the access road to the rear of Nos 544-436 Brighton Road, thence northeastwards along said access road to a point opposite the southwestern boundary of No 47 Kingsdown Avenue, thence northwestwards to and along said boundary and southwestwards along the rear boundaries of Nos 49-73 Kingsdown Avenue to the southwestern boundary of No 73 Kingsdown Avenue, thence northwestwards along said boundary to said avenue, thence northeast-wards along said avenue to Coningsby Road, thence northwestwards along said road to Mount Park Avenue, thence southwards along said avenue to a point opposite the southern boundary of No 52 Mount Park Avenue, thence northwestwards to and along said boundary to the eastern boundary of Waddon Ward, thence generally northwards along said boundary to the point of commencement.

2002-2018

Councillors

Croham Election Results

1978-2002

1978

1982

1986

1990

1994

1998

2002-2014

2002

2006

2010

2014

References

Former wards of the London Borough of Croydon
2018 disestablishments in England